Redlake Meadows & Hoggs Moor is a Site of Special Scientific Interest (SSSI), noted for its biological characteristics, in Cornwall, England, UK. Within the SSSI is Redlake Cottage Meadows nature reserve owned by the Cornwall Wildlife Trust.

Geography
The nature reserve covers the central  of the SSSI.

Flora and fauna
Both the rare heath lobelia (Lobelia urens) and the vulnerable and protected marsh fritillary butterfly are found there. After the sighting of the latter species in 1995, Cornwall Wildlife Trust received a grant from the Hanson Environment Fund that enabled the trust to protect it through scrub control and fencing. Other nationally scarce species include Wavy-leaved St John's-wort (Hypericum undulatum) and yellow bartsia (Parentucellia viscosa).

10 native breed ponies have been introduced to help manage the site.

References

External links

 Cornwall Wildlife Trust: Redlake Cottage Meadows

Nature reserves of the Cornwall Wildlife Trust
Sites of Special Scientific Interest in Cornwall
Sites of Special Scientific Interest notified in 1995
Meadows in Cornwall
Moorlands of England